Contreras Island (Spanish: Isla Contreras) is an island in the Queen Adelaide Archipelago in Magallanes y la Antártica Chilena Region, Chile. Its area is 626 km2.

Queen Adelaide Archipelago
Islands of Magallanes Region